Angelica capitellata, synonym Sphenosciadium capitellatum, is a species of flowering plant in the family Apiaceae. When treated as Sphenosciadium capitellatum, it was the only species in the monotypic genus Sphenosciadium. It is known by the common names woollyhead parsnip, ranger's buttons,  button parsley, and swamp white heads.

Description

The stem and leaves are usually green but sometimes nearly white in color, smooth below but with rough hairs on the inflorescence. The leaflets may also be intricately divided into small segments.

It blooms from July to August. The nearly spherical, headlike terminal umbellets contain many tiny white or purple-tinged flowers, whose protruding stamens make them appear very fuzzy in full bloom, as for the central umbels in the top right image.

Distribution and habitat 
The plant is native to western North America from eastern Oregon and central Idaho through Nevada and southern California, reaching into Baja California. It grows in moist habitat types, such as creeksides and meadows.

Ranger's buttons plants are quite similar to the other large Umbelliferae that share similar habitats: Sierra angelica and cow parsnip, but each has a very differently shaped leaf, and the other two have umbellets with quite distinct flowers, in contrast to the tight balls on ranger's buttons.

Toxicity 
The species is included in Toxic Plants of North America (2001).

References

External links 

Jepson Manual Treatment: Sphenosciadium capitellatum
USDA Plants Profile for Sphenosciadium capitellatum
Sphenosciadium capitellatum — U.C. Photo gallery

capitellata
Flora of California
Flora of Baja California
Flora of Oregon
Flora of Idaho
Flora of Nevada
Flora of the Sierra Nevada (United States)